Hindustan Copper Ltd. is a central public sector undertaking under the ownership of Ministry of Mines, Government of India.  HCL is the only vertically integrated government-owned-copper producer in India engaged in a wide spectrum of activities ranging from mining, beneficiation, smelting, refining and continuous cast rod manufacturer.

HCL shares are listed at Mumbai, Delhi, Kolkata, Chennai, Ahmedabad exchanges. On 31 July 2015, the Government of India announced a 15% stake sale in Hindustan Copper Limited, reducing its stake from 89.5% to 74.5%.

Origin
Hindustan Copper Ltd. (HCL) was incorporated on 9 November 1967 to take over the plants and mines at Khetri, Kolihan in Rajasthan and Rakha Copper Project in Jharkhand from National Mineral Development Corporation. The central office is located at Kolkata which is the capital of the West Bengal state in India.

In 1972 Indian Copper Corporation Limited, Private Sector Company, located at Ghatsila, Jharkhand with Smelter and Refinery was Nationalized and made part of HCL. Hindustan Copper Limited developed Malanjkhand Copper Project in Madhya Pradesh, the largest hard rock Open pit mine in the country which was dedicated to the nation on 12 November 1982. Further in 1990 a Continuous Cast Wire Rod plant of South Wire Technology was commissioned at Taloja in Maharashtra.

Services
HCL also produces gold silver, nickel sulphate, selenium, tellurium and fertiliser as by products. It is the first Indian Copper Producer to be accredited with ISO 9002 certification for Continuous Cast Rod Manufacturer at its Taloja Plant and for manufacture of cathode at its refineries both at Indian Copper Complex, Ghatsila, Jharkhand and Khetri Copper Complex, Khetri, Rajasthan

Hindustan Copper Limited is engaged in mining and smelting of copper, having its production facilities and offices at various locations across the country. On 29 June 2012, CMD of the company said that construction of a smelting refinery at Visakhapatnam with an annual capacity of 600,000 tonne at a cost of ₹20 billion is under consideration.

Units

Khetri Copper Complex
Located in the state of Rajasthan,  from Delhi  
Capacity - 31,000 tpa copper cathode (the smelter and acid plant at KCC are under shutdown since late 2008 due to the slump in global commodity prices witnessed in 2008 and old machinery. Currently, only concentrator for production of copper concentrate is working in addition to associated mines.)
By-products- sulphuric acid  
Mines - Khetri and Kolihan (producing 9,500 mt metal in concentrate / annum)
Reserve    
Khetri 34.56 million tonnes @ 1.13% cu
Kolihan 22.45 million tonnes @ 1.33% cu
Banwas 24.97 million tonnes @ 1.69% cu

Indian Copper Complex
Located in the state of Jharkhand 
Capacity 16,500 tpa copper cathode    
By products Sulfuric acid, gold, silver, palladium, selenium, tellurium, nickel sulphate 
Mines - Surda 
Reserve  
Surda 19.30 million tonnes @1.17% cu

Malanjkhand Copper Project
Located in Madhya Pradesh  from Jabalpur,  from Raipur   
Capacity open cast mine with a capacity of 2 million tonnes with matching concentrator  
Mines - Malanjkhand Open-pit mining
Reserve 208.030 million tonnes @1.3% cu 
Features of the open pit mine   
length 2600 meter 
Width 700 meter 
Planned depth: 240 meter below average ground level
The open pit mine has reached ultimate pit depth and further it's not economically viable to exploit the mineral with open pit mining, Hence the mine is being converted to underground mines with enhanced capacity of 5 million tonnes with an investment to the tune of 2000 crores.

Taloja Copper Project 
Located in the state of Maharashtra, district-Raigad,  from Mumbai   
Capacity 60,000 tpa continuous cast copper rod - hindcop rods   
Technology plant is based on the latest 'southwire technology'    
Product range 8 mm, 11 mm, 12.5 mm, 16 mm and 19 mm cc rod

References

External links
 Official website
Divestment of Hindustan Copper Ltd in coming fiscal-Source-Economic Times
 Latest Recruitment Notification
Hindustan Copper Ltd. News-Source Google Finance
Hindustan Copper sees stake sale OK next week-Source-2 Jun 2010, Reuters

Copper mining companies of India
Government-owned companies of India
Ministry of Mines (India)
Companies based in Kolkata
Non-renewable resource companies established in 1967
Indian companies established in 1967
1967 establishments in West Bengal
Companies listed on the National Stock Exchange of India
Companies listed on the Bombay Stock Exchange